The 1930 Marquette Golden Avalanche football team represented Marquette University as an independent during the 1930 college football season. In its ninth season under head coach Frank Murray, the team compiled an undefeated 8–0–1 record, shut out eight of nine opponents, and outscored all opponents by a total of 155 to 7. The sole setback was a scoreless tie with Gus Dorais' Detroit Titans on November 15. Marquette played its home games at Marquette Stadium in Milwaukee.

Frank Murray was Marquette's head football coach for 19 years and was posthumously inducted into the College Football Hall of Fame in 1983.

Schedule

References

Marquette
Marquette Golden Avalanche football seasons
College football undefeated seasons
Marquette Golden Avalanche football